The J. Everett Collins Center for the Performing Arts (also the Collins Center or J. Everett Collins Center) is a 1,203 seat, publicly owned theatre in Andover, Massachusetts which functions as both a venue for municipal functions and a facility for private rentals. Auditorium space is used for Andover's annual town meetings and functions as an auditorium for Andover High School, connected to its southeast side. The Collins Center houses offices, facilities and classrooms for the school's drama guild, vocal ensembles, orchestra and band. Paying homage to John Everett Collins,  

the theatre was named after the Andover musician and politician for his service to the community. Once managed by the Andover Endowment for the Arts, Inc. (an independent non-profit organization), an operations director now acts as manager on behalf of the town for event scheduling.

Construction 
Approval for the addition of an auditorium onto the existing high school campus was given in 1978 with town meeting warrant article 60 allocating $720,000 for such and other school improvement projects. By 1980, it was evident that additional funding was necessary for "constructing, originally equipping and furnishing an auditorium to the High School" and the town would allocate an additional $4,370,000 for the project that year Construction was completed in 1983 and the theatre would hold its inaugural performance on September 25 of that year. By end of fiscal year 1983, $199.02 were unexpended from the 1978 allocation, as were $740,213.81 from the 1980 allocation, making the project $740,412.83 under budget.

Technical specifications

Stage 
The stage is constructed of black-painted Masonite, laid over four-inch plywood and set upon concrete. Between the proscenium, the stage is 84 feet wide, 32 feet deep from the plaster line to the upstage wall, 25 feet tall from the stage floor to the top of the proscenium and is raised 42 inches from the house floor. The stage right wing extends ten feet from the edge of the proscenium to the stage right wall. The stage left wing extends five feet from the edge of the proscenium to the fly rail. Both wings extend the full 32 feet depth of the stage. From the plaster line, the apron extends six feet downstage. This apron can be further extended using platforms in the orchestra pit.

Fly system

Rigging 
There are a total of forty-four line sets, including the fire curtain (autonomously controlled with building fire alarm system) and ten loaded and fixed pipes (five electrics, four orchestra panels and one movie projection screen). The forty-three executable line sets are T-track counterweight sets, operable from the stage left deck. Due to the location of a door on the stage left wall, ten sets are raised on a fly gallery and therefore double-purchased. All arbors are seven feet tall and can hold a maximum load of 1100 pounds.

Soft goods 
The house curtain and valance are blue velour; all other velour goods (one mid-stage traveler, two black drops and four sets of legs) are black. Stage inventory also includes various mylar drops, an off-white 50-foot wide cyclorama and a 40-foot wide black scrim.

Electrical 
Power can be tied in 15 feet off stage left to 400 amp three-phase alternating current via single pole connectors. Additional 20 amp circuits are located on both stage left and right decks. There are a total of 83 dimmers capable of 2.4 kW each that are controlled using the AMX protocol (or DMX via adapter). Each dimmer has its own 20 amp circuit, with tie-ins located throughout the theater.

Lighting 
The Collins Center has 102 Source Four ellipsoidal fixtures of varying degrees, 60 PARs and PARNels, and four Altman cyclorama lights. Two additional 750 watt, 19-degree Source Fours are used for follow spots and are fixed on the front-of-house catwalk. These fixtures are conventional stage lighting, therefore manual focusing is necessary and color modification requires the use of gels. Stage lighting is controlled using the AMX protocol, however DMX may be used via an in-house converter.

Projection capability is possible either through front or rear projection onto a movie screen on batten 9, or onto the cyclorama using front projection.

Audio 
The public address system consists of speakers located to the left, right and above the proscenium arch, controlled by a 32-channel audio mixing board between the left and right mezzanines in the house. A sixteen-send, four-return snake extends from the mixing board to the orchestra pit.

Orchestral 
A 61-foot-wide orchestra pit curves out 12 feet into the house from the downstage end of the stage. This curves down along a 100-foot radius to 6 feet, 9 inches at the left and right ends. The height of platforms in the pit can be adjusted to be either: a) 18 inches below the house floor, b) level with the house floor, or c) raised to act as an apron extension at stage height. On the stage, 9' 9" wide floor panels can be arranged to create a 19-foot tall orchestra shell. 4 additional flown sound panels complete an on-stage acoustic accommodation. The Collins Center also contains one 9-foot grand piano in its inventory.

Notable performances

References

Andover, Massachusetts
Theatres in Massachusetts